Tasik Kenyir or Kenyir Lake is an artificial lake located in Hulu Terengganu, Terengganu, Malaysia, nestled deep in the Pantai Timur Range. The lake was created in 1985 by the Kenyir Dam on the Kenyir River, the upper stream of the Terengganu River. The lake provides water to the nearby Sultan Mahmud Power Station. It is the largest man-made lake in mainland Southeast Asia with an area of 260,000 hectares.

Flora and fauna

Kenyir Lake is also home to numerous species of freshwater fishes and exotic wildlife. With a water catchment area of 38,000 hectares, the lake is naturally a haven for freshwater fish. A recent study revealed that there are some 300 species of freshwater fish dwelling in the lake. The presence of dead trees around the lake serves as a perfect breeding ground for these fishes. Algae growing on dead trees and branches serve as the main form of sustenance for the fishes. From studies and observations conducted by the Department of Fisheries, species such as the big Lampam Sungai (barboides), Kelah (Malayan mahseer or Tor tambroides), Toman (snakehead), Tapah (wallagonia leerii) Kawan (Friendly Barb), Kalui (Giant Gouramy) and Kelisa (green arowana) are found in waters and around dead trees.

The jungles surrounding Kenyir Lake are home to some endangered species, such as Asian elephants and Malaysian tigers.

Tourism
Although a reservoir, the area has been successfully developed for eco-tourism, and there are many resorts on its shores. Fishing is popular, as are jungle treks, waterfalls and caves.
According to the locals, the best season for fishing is August when the water level is lower.
Popular spots for jungle trekking are Pengkalan Gawi, Bewah at the Terengganuan section of the Taman Negara, along the rivers of Saok, Lasir, Tembat and Lawit. Kayaking, canoeing, boating, whitewater rafting and rapids shooting are among the many water sports available here.

The Story of Lake Kenyir
A long time ago before being flooded, Kenyir Lake, once fertile and beautiful, was once part of the earliest settlement area in Hulu Terengganu.
Although it is no longer a reference, the names of villages such as Melor, Keliok, Berching, Evening, Mentong, Malacca, Kuala Terenggan, Kerbak and Belimbing will be heard when some of the hydro-electric dams are on track.
But now the story of the people who once lived far upstream of the Terengganu River was not something that was known. Most of the oral stories that descend from generation to generation have been forgotten.
Located in Kampung Dura, Kuala Berang named Abbas Othman is well known as a former resident who lived in the village on the base of Lake Kenyir before being flooded in 1984.
At age 77, Abbas can be said to be among the last generation of 'lake dwellers' who are willing to share life stories in his native village, Kampung Kuala Terenggan.
When sharing his childhood memory, Abbas admits that the life of the village about 60 years ago is far different from the present life.
He said the life of the village can be likened to being in a unique world.
Abbas said the position of a village apart from other settlements led the population to rely heavily on natural resources so that the ringgit did not have any value.
"When I was a kid I never saw money because the villagers did not use money to buy things.
"I like rice planting rice, I want to fish in the river," he said.
According to Abbas, money will only be withdrawn from guri (small shrimp) several times a year when residents want to go to Kuala Terengganu to buy salt and clothing.
He added that the ride on bamboo rafts to Kuala Terengganu about 50 kilometers from his village took four to five days.
"Traveling with bamboo rafts is very challenging as people are forced to catch a river that is rugged and rocky.
"Usually one raft contains three to four people. They will swing in turns. There was a time when the raft broke into the stream, "he said.
According to Abbas, life in the middle of the jungle that the people in the area had begun to get the attention of the government around the 1950s to suggest that residents move.
He said the government promised compensation of four hectares of land to those who moved to Kuala Berang.
"The first migration began in 1950 after the people felt that life in the forest was covered by poverty.
"They move in stages because some do not want to move because they love the vast garden and rice fields," he said.
According to Abbas, he and his family moved three times from Kampung Kuala Terenggan to Kampung Petang and to Kampung Berching before settling fully in Kampung Dura since 1959.
He added that the passage of a resident from the Kenyir Lake policy was about 20 years before the construction of the Sultan Mahmud Electric Power Station dam at Kampung Jenagor, Kuala Berang.
"As I remember, there are about 80 families involved in the first round of the move," he said.
Apart from residents from Kampung Petang and Berching, Kampung Dura is now also being shared by residents from Kampung Kelitok and Berching.
At present, the former village that turns into the lake is still visible on the riverbed which still retains its original name.

References

External links

Tasik Kenyir main website 
Tourism Malaysia - Kenyir Lake
Kenyir Information Site by the Central Terengganu Development Board (Malay-language only)
Kenyir Eco Site (English-language only)

Reservoirs in Malaysia
Tourist attractions in Terengganu
Landforms of Terengganu